
Gmina Nowe Brzesko is an urban-rural gmina (administrative district) in Proszowice County, Lesser Poland Voivodeship, in southern Poland.

It was formerly classed as a rural gmina, becoming urban-rural when Nowe Brzesko became a town on 1 January 2011.

Villages
Apart from the town of Nowe Brzesko, Gmina Nowe Brzesko contains the villages and settlements of Grębocin, Gruszów, Hebdów, Kuchary, Majkowice, Mniszów, Mniszów-Kolonia, Pławowice, Przybysławice, Rudno Dolne, Sierosławice, Śmiłowice and Szpitary.

Neighbouring gminas
Gmina Nowe Brzesko is bordered by the gminas of Drwinia, Igołomia-Wawrzeńczyce, Koszyce and Proszowice.

References
Polish official population figures 2006

Nowe Brzesko
Proszowice County